The Ahmadiyya Caliphate is a non-political caliphate established on May 27, 1908 following the death of Mirza Ghulam Ahmad, the founder of the Ahmadiyya Muslim Community, who claimed to be the promised Messiah and Mahdi, the expected redeemer awaited by Muslims. It is believed by Ahmadis to be the re-establishment of the Rashidun Caliphate that commenced following the death of the Islamic prophet Muhammad. The caliphs are entitled Khalīfatul Masīh, sometimes simply referred to as Khalifa (or Caliph). The caliph is the elected spiritual and organizational leader of the worldwide Ahmadiyya Muslim Community and is the successor of Ghulam Ahmad. He is believed by the Community to be divinely ordained and is also referred to by its members as Amir al-Mu'minin (Leader of the Faithful) and Imam Jama'at (Imam of the Community). The 5th and current Caliph of the Messiah of the Ahmadiyya Community is Mirza Masroor Ahmad.

After the death of Ghulam Ahmad, his successors directed the Ahmadiyya Community from Qadian, India which remained the headquarters of the community until 1947 with the creation of Pakistan. From this time on the headquarters remained in Rabwah, a town built on land bought in Pakistan by the community in 1948. In 1984, Ordinance XX was promulgated by the government of Pakistan which prohibited Ahmadi Muslims from any public expression of the Islamic faith, rendering the caliph unable to perform his duties as the leader of the community. Due to these circumstances, the 4th caliph left Pakistan and migrated to London, England, provisionally moving the headquarters to the Fazl Mosque.

Since the Ahmadiyya is widely viewed as a heterodox movement by the mainstream of Sunni and Shia Islam, most Muslims outside the movement do not recognise Ahmadi claims to a caliphate.

Overview 

Ahmadi Muslims believe the system of caliphate (Arabic: Khilāfah) to be an ancillary to the system of prophethood, continuing to strive for the objectives for which a prophet is sent and to carry to completion the tasks of reformation and moral training that were seeded by the prophet. The caliphs, as successors to the prophets, lead the community of believers after a prophet's death.

Ahmadis maintain that in accordance with Quranic verses (such as ) and numerous hadith on the issue, the caliphate can only be established by God Himself and is a divine blessing given to those who believe and work righteousness, upholding the Unity of God. Therefore, any movement to establish the caliphate centered around human endeavours alone is bound to fail, particularly when the condition of the people diverges from the ‘precepts of Prophethood’ (minhājin nabūwwah) and they are as a result disunited.  Although the caliph (Arabic: khalifa) in Ahmadiyya is elected, it is believed that God Himself directs the hearts and minds of believers through visions, dreams and spiritual guidance towards a particular individual. No campaigning, speeches or speculation of any kind are permitted. Thus the caliph is designated neither necessarily by right (i.e. the rightful or competent one in the eyes of the  people at that time) nor merely by election but primarily by God.

According to Ahmadiyya thought, just as it is not essential for a prophet to be the head of a state, it is not essential for a caliph to be the head of a state, rather the religious and organisational significance of the caliphate is emphasised. It is above all a religious office, with the purpose to uphold, strengthen and spread Islam and maintain the high moral standards within the Muslim community established by Muhammad, who was not merely a political leader but primarily a religious leader. The caliphate is understood as a system dealing with the organisation of believers and relating to the administration (nizām) of the Muslim community whether or not it involves a governmental role. Being based on the 'precept of Prophethood', the institution of caliphate can therefore, like prophethood, exist and flourish without a state. If a caliph does happen to bear governmental authority as a head of state, it is incidental and subsidiary in relation to his overall function as caliph which is applicable to believers transnationally and not limited to one particular state or political entity. The system of caliphate in Islam, thus understood, transcends national sovereignty and ethnic divide, forming a universal supra-national entity and the role of a caliph as the leader of the Muslim community, in such an understanding, surpasses that of a monarch.

Because Muhammad became the head of state at Medina, the Rightly Guided successors after him also happened to be heads of state and – similar to the successors of Moses who led the Israelites after his death and, following the conquest of Canaan, gained control over a territory– functioned as political and military as well as religious leaders. Since Ghulam Ahmad, whom Ahmadis hold to be the promised Mahdi, was, like Jesus, not the head of a state, his successors after him – like the successors of Jesus did – function without attaching themselves to any state, seeking no political role and having no territorial ambition. In terms of the political aspect of the caliphate as envisioned within the Ahmadiyya community, since God's sovereignty is seen as extending over the universe, the ideal polity within Islam is one where the caliph is the spiritual head guiding, in accordance with Islamic principles, a federation or confederation of autonomous states (functioning under any political system or form of government) associated together for the maintenance of peace and cooperating in promoting human welfare throughout the world. Such a framework allows the caliph to relegate, if he sees fit, most or all his secular authority to the elected representatives of the members of such a confederation.

Basis in Qur'an and Hadith 
According to Ahmadiyya belief, God has promised in the Qur'an to appoint a successor among the righteous. In this respect, verse 56 (55 if the Basmallah isn't counted) of Surah Al-Nur says: 

A prophecy by Muhammad about the reestablishment of righteous Khilafat is narrated in Musnad Ahmad:

The second Manifestation of God’s power 

The succession of the caliph is believed by the Ahmadis to be the second manifestation of God’s power that Ghulam Ahmad wrote about in his last testament Al-Wassiyyat (The Will).

The Lahore Ahmadiyya Movement however does not subscribe to this belief and follow the concept of Anjuman (Council) that was described in the same book.

List of Ahmadiyya Caliphs

See also 
 Khalifatul Rasul Allah
 International Baiat

References

External links 

 
Caliphates